

T

References

Lists of words